Parapirga is a monotypic moth genus in the subfamily Lymantriinae. Its only species, Parapirga neurabrunnea, is found in Angola. Both the genus and the species were first described by George Thomas Bethune-Baker in 1911.

References

Endemic fauna of Angola
Lymantriinae
Monotypic moth genera